Fábio Daniel Marques Lima (born 16 October 1988) is a Portuguese futsal player who plays for Modicus Sandim and the Portugal national team.

References

External links
Sporting CP profile
FPF national team profile
FPF club profile

1988 births
Living people
Portuguese men's futsal players
Sporting CP futsal players
Sportspeople from Porto